Neil Galbraith is an Australian curler.

At the international level, he is a  curler.

Teams and events

References

External links

Living people
Australian male curlers
Pacific-Asian curling champions

Date of birth missing (living people)
Place of birth missing (living people)
Year of birth missing (living people)